"Last Frontier" is a song by Australian rock singer, Jimmy Barnes, from his third studio album, Freight Train Heart.

A live version was released in January 1989 as the second and final single from Barnes' first live album, Barnstorming. The song peaked at number 31 in Australia.

Track listing
Australian 7" single (Mushroom K784)/ 12" (Mushroom X13360)
Side A "Last Frontier" 
Side B "Many Rivers to Cross" (with Crowded House)

Music video
A music video was produced to promote the single.

Charts

References

1989 singles
1987 songs
Songs written by Jonathan Cain
Mushroom Records singles
Jimmy Barnes songs
Songs written by Jimmy Barnes